International Online Riichi Mahjong Competition (IORMC/ko:국제온라인마작대회) is the international competition of Mahjong under Japanese rule in Tenhou.net the online mahjong service since 2012.
The competition is organized by the Korean Mahjong League (KML).

History 
The International Online Riichi Mahjong Competition (IORMC) was originally started as "Korea-Japan Online Mahjong Exchange Match" and "Asian Online Riichi Mahjong Competition" in 2011.

Format 
The competition utilizes a simultaneous team round robin.  Participants play out a set number of games against each other, while not being matched with players from their own teams.  Team scores is a cumulative of all team member scores.  A separate competition determines the individual winner, via qualification from the team format.  Qualified players compete in a mahjong bracket system to determine the individual winner.

Champions

Team

Individual

References

External links 
Korean Mahjong League

Mahjong world championships